Wanaparthy district is a district in the Indian state of Telangana. Its headquarters is Wanaparthy. The district shares boundaries with Gadwal, Mahabubnagar, Narayanpet, Nagarkurnool districts and with the state boundary of Andhra pradesh.

Geography 

Mahbubnagar district is situated in the north of this district, Nagarkurnool district in the east, Andhra Pradesh in the south and Jogulamba Gadwal district in the west.

Demographics 
 Census of India, the district has a population of 1,238,660.

Administrative divisions 
The district has one revenue division of Wanaparthy and is sub-divided into 14 mandals. Shaik Yasmeen Basha is the present collector of the district. Singireddy Niranjan Reddy is the legislative leader of wanaparthy constituency. He won 2018 general elections by a margin of 51,685 votes. Currently, he is the minister of state for Agriculture, Marketing, Civil Supplies in Telangana state.

Mandals 
The below table categorizes mandals into their respective revenue divisions in the district:

Notable personalities 
 Singireddy Niranjan Reddy – Cabinet minister, Telangana.(Agriculture, Marketing, Civil supplies, co-operation, consumer)
 Ravula Chandra Sekar Reddy – Politician from Telugu Desam Party ex-MLA for wanaparthy constituency
 Dr.Gillela Chinna Reddy – Politician from Indian National Congress ex-MLA for wanaparthy constituency
 Raghavendar Askani – Politician from Loksatta Party, Founder Youth Parliament Program
 Kiran Rao - Indian film producer, granddaughter of Raja J. Rameshwar Rao
 Aditi Rao Hydari - Indian film actress, granddaughter of Raja J. Rameshwar Rao

See also 
 List of districts in Telangana

References

External links 

 Wanaparthy district

 
Districts of Telangana